This is a list of the bird species recorded in Uruguay. The avifauna of Uruguay has 490 confirmed species, of which seven have been introduced by humans, 69 are rare or vagrants, and four are extirpated or believed extinct. An additional eight species are hypothetical (see below). None are endemic.

Unless an entry is cited otherwise, the list of species is that of the South American Classification Committee (SACC) of the American Ornithological Society. The list's taxonomic treatment (designation and sequence of orders, families, and species) and nomenclature (common and scientific names) are also those of the SACC.

The following tags have been used to highlight certain categories of occurrence.

(V) Vagrant – a species that rarely or accidentally occurs in Uruguay
(H) Hypothetical – a species recorded but with "no tangible evidence" according to the SACC
(I) Introduced – a species introduced to Uruguay as a consequence, direct or indirect, of human actions

Rheas
Order: RheiformesFamily: Rheidae

The rheas are large flightless birds native to South America. Their feet have three toes rather than four which allows them to run faster. One species has been recorded in Uruguay.

Greater rhea, Rhea americana

Tinamous
Order: TinamiformesFamily: Tinamidae

The tinamous are one of the most ancient groups of bird. Although they look similar to other ground-dwelling birds like quail and grouse, they have no close relatives and are classified as a single family, Tinamidae, within their own order, the Tinamiformes. They are distantly related to the ratites (order Struthioniformes), that includes the rheas, emus, and kiwis. Three species have been recorded in Uruguay.

Brown tinamou, Crypturellus obsoletus
Red-winged tinamou, Rhynchotus rufescens
Spotted nothura, Nothura maculosa

Screamers
Order: AnseriformesFamily: Anhimidae

The screamers are a small family of birds related to the ducks. They are large, bulky birds, with a small downy head, long legs, and large feet which are only partially webbed. They have large spurs on their wings which are used in fights over mates and in territorial disputes. Two species have been recorded in Uruguay.

Horned screamer, Anhima cornuta (V)
Southern screamer, Chauna torquata

Ducks
Order: AnseriformesFamily: Anatidae

Anatidae includes the ducks and most duck-like waterfowl, such as geese and swans. These birds are adapted to an aquatic existence with webbed feet, flattened bills, and feathers that are excellent at shedding water due to an oily coating. Twenty-two species have been recorded in Uruguay.

Fulvous whistling-duck, Dendrocygna bicolor
White-faced whistling-duck, Dendrocygna viduata
Black-bellied whistling-duck, Dendrocygna autumnalis
Black-necked swan, Cygnus melancoryphus
Coscoroba swan, Coscoroba coscoroba
Upland goose, Chloephaga picta (H)
Muscovy duck, Cairina moschata
Comb duck, Sarkidiornis sylvicola (V)
Ringed teal, Callonetta leucophrys
Brazilian teal, Amazonetta brasiliensis
Silver teal, Spatula versicolor
Red shoveler, Spatula platalea
Blue-winged teal, Spatula discors (V)
Cinnamon teal, Spatula cyanoptera
Chiloe wigeon, Mareca sibilatrix
White-cheeked pintail, Anas bahamensis
Yellow-billed pintail, Anas georgica
Yellow-billed teal, Anas flavirostris
Rosy-billed pochard, Netta peposaca
Black-headed duck, Heteronetta atricapilla
Masked duck, Nomonyx dominica
Lake duck, Oxyura vittata

Guans
Order: GalliformesFamily: Cracidae

The Cracidae are large birds, similar in general appearance to turkeys. The guans and curassows live in trees, but the smaller chachalacas are found in more open scrubby habitats. They are generally dull-plumaged, but the curassows and some guans have colorful facial ornaments. Two species have been recorded in Uruguay.

Dusky-legged guan, Penelope obscura
Chaco chachalaca, Ortalis canicollis (H)

New World quails
Order: GalliformesFamily: Odontophoridae

The New World quails are small, plump terrestrial birds only distantly related to the quails of the Old World, but named for their similar appearance and habits. One species has been recorded in Uruguay.

Spot-winged wood-quail, Odontophorus capueira (extirpated)

Flamingos
Order: PhoenicopteriformesFamily: Phoenicopteridae

Flamingos filter-feed on shellfish and algae. Their oddly shaped beaks are specially adapted to separate mud and silt from the food they consume and are used upside-down. Two species have been recorded in Uruguay.

Chilean flamingo, Phoenicopterus chilensis
Andean flamingo, Phoenicoparrus andinus (V)

Grebes
Order: PodicipediformesFamily: Podicipedidae

Grebes are small to medium-large freshwater diving birds. They have lobed toes and are excellent swimmers and divers. However, they have their feet placed far back on the body, making them quite ungainly on land. Five species have been recorded in Uruguay.

White-tufted grebe, Rollandia rolland
Least grebe, Tachybaptus dominicus
Pied-billed grebe, Podilymbus podiceps
Great grebe, Podiceps major
Silvery grebe, Podiceps occipitalis (V)

Pigeons
Order: ColumbiformesFamily: Columbidae

Pigeons and doves are stout-bodied birds with short necks and short slender bills with a fleshy cere. Ten species have been recorded in Uruguay.

Rock pigeon, Columba livia (I)
Picazuro pigeon, Patagioenas picazuro
Spot-winged pigeon, Patagioenas maculosa
Pale-vented pigeon, Patagioenas cayennensis
Ruddy quail-dove, Geotrygon montana (V)
White-tipped dove, Leptotila verreauxi
Gray-fronted dove, Leptotila rufaxilla
Eared dove, Zenaida auriculata
Ruddy ground dove, Columbina talpacoti
Picui ground dove, Columbina picui

Cuckoos
Order: CuculiformesFamily: Cuculidae

The family Cuculidae includes cuckoos, roadrunners, and anis. These birds are of variable size with slender bodies, long tails, and strong legs. Eight species have been recorded in Uruguay.

Guira cuckoo, Guira guira
Greater ani, Crotophaga major
Smooth-billed ani, Crotophaga ani
Striped cuckoo, Tapera naevia
Ash-colored cuckoo, Coccycua cinerea
Squirrel cuckoo, Piaya cayana
Dark-billed cuckoo, Coccyzus melacoryphus
Yellow-billed cuckoo, Coccyzus americanus

Potoos
Order: NyctibiiformesFamily: Nyctibiidae

The potoos (sometimes called poor-me-ones) are large near passerine birds related to the nightjars and frogmouths. They are nocturnal insectivores which lack the bristles around the mouth found in the true nightjars. One species has been recorded in Uruguay.

Common potoo, Nyctibius griseus

Nightjars
Order: CaprimulgiformesFamily: Caprimulgidae

Nightjars are medium-sized nocturnal birds that usually nest on the ground. They have long wings, short legs, and very short bills. Most have small feet, of little use for walking, and long pointed wings. Their soft plumage is camouflaged to resemble bark or leaves. Six species have been recorded in Uruguay.

Nacunda nighthawk, Chordeiles nacunda
Common nighthawk, Chordeiles minor
Band-winged nightjar, Systellura longirostris
Common pauraque, Nyctidromus albicollis
Little nightjar, Setopagis parvula
Scissor-tailed nightjar, Hydropsalis torquata

Swifts
Order: ApodiformesFamily: Apodidae

Swifts are small birds which spend the majority of their lives flying. These birds have very short legs and never settle voluntarily on the ground, perching instead only on vertical surfaces. Many swifts have long swept-back wings which resemble a crescent or boomerang. Two species have been recorded in Uruguay.

White-collared swift, Streptoprocne zonaris (V)
Sick's swift, Chaetura meridionalis (V)

Hummingbirds
Order: ApodiformesFamily: Trochilidae

Hummingbirds are small birds capable of hovering in mid-air due to the rapid flapping of their wings. They are the only birds that can fly backwards. Eight species have been recorded in Uruguay.

Black jacobin, Florisuga fusca 
Black-throated mango, Anthracothorax nigricollis (V)
Blue-tufted starthroat, Heliomaster furcifer
Glittering-bellied emerald, Chlorostilbon lucidus
Violet-capped woodnymph, Thalurania glaucopis (H)
Swallow-tailed hummingbird, Eupetomena macroura (V)
White-throated hummingbird, Leucochloris albicollis
Gilded hummingbird, Hylocharis chrysura

Limpkin
Order: GruiformesFamily: Aramidae

The limpkin resembles a large rail. It has drab-brown plumage and a grayer head and neck.

Limpkin, Aramus guarauna

Rails
Order: GruiformesFamily: Rallidae

Rallidae is a large family of small to medium-sized birds which includes the rails, crakes, coots, and gallinules. Typically they inhabit dense vegetation in damp environments near lakes, swamps, or rivers. In general they are shy and secretive birds, making them difficult to observe. Most species have strong legs and long toes which are well adapted to soft uneven surfaces. They tend to have short, rounded wings and to be weak fliers. Seventeen species have been recorded in Uruguay.

Purple gallinule, Porphyrio martinica
Azure gallinule, Porphyrio flavirostris (V)
Rufous-sided crake, Laterallus melanophaius
Red-and-white crake, Laterallus leucopyrrhus
Speckled rail, Coturnicops notatus
Ash-throated crake, Mustelirallus albicollis
Spotted rail, Pardirallus maculatus
Plumbeous rail, Pardirallus sanguinolentus
Giant wood-rail, Aramides ypecaha
Gray-cowled wood-rail, Aramides cajaneus
Spot-flanked gallinule, Porphyriops melanops
Yellow-breasted crake, Hapalocrex flaviventer (V)
Dot-winged crake, Porzana spiloptera
Common gallinule, Gallinula galeata
Red-fronted coot, Fulica rufifrons
Red-gartered coot, Fulica armillata
White-winged coot, Fulica leucoptera

Plovers
Order: CharadriiformesFamily: Charadriidae

The family Charadriidae includes the plovers, dotterels, and lapwings. They are small to medium-sized birds with compact bodies, short thick necks, and long, usually pointed, wings. They are found in open country worldwide, mostly in habitats near water. Eight species have been recorded in Uruguay.

American golden-plover, Pluvialis dominica
Black-bellied plover, Pluvialis squatarola
Tawny-throated dotterel, Oreopholus ruficollis
Southern lapwing, Vanellus chilensis
Rufous-chested dotterel, Charadrius modestus
Semipalmated plover, Charadrius semipalmatus
Collared plover, Charadrius collaris
Two-banded plover, Charadrius falklandicus

Oystercatchers
Order: CharadriiformesFamily: Haematopodidae

The oystercatchers are large and noisy plover-like birds, with strong bills used for smashing or prising open molluscs. Two species have been recorded in Uruguay.

American oystercatcher, Haematopus palliatus
Blackish oystercatcher, Haematopus ater (V)

Avocets and stilts
Order: CharadriiformesFamily: Recurvirostridae

Recurvirostridae is a family of large wading birds which includes the avocets and stilts. The avocets have long legs and long up-curved bills. The stilts have extremely long legs and long, thin, straight bills. One species has been recorded in Uruguay.

Black-necked stilt, Himantopus mexicanus

Sheathbills
Order: CharadriiformesFamily: Chionididae

The sheathbills are scavengers of the Antarctic regions. They have white plumage and look plump and dove-like but are believed to be similar to the ancestors of the modern gulls and terns. One species has been recorded in Uruguay.

Snowy sheathbill, Chionis albus

Sandpipers
Order: CharadriiformesFamily: Scolopacidae

Scolopacidae is a large diverse family of small to medium-sized shorebirds including the sandpipers, curlews, godwits, shanks, tattlers, woodcocks, snipes, dowitchers, and phalaropes. The majority of these species eat small invertebrates picked out of the mud or soil. Variation in length of legs and bills enables multiple species to feed in the same habitat, particularly on the coast, without direct competition for food. Twenty-four species have been recorded in Uruguay.

Upland sandpiper, Bartramia longicauda
Eskimo curlew, Numenius borealis (believed extinct)
Whimbrel, Numenius phaeopus
Hudsonian godwit, Limosa haemastica
Ruddy turnstone, Arenaria interpres
Red knot, Calidris canutus
Stilt sandpiper, Calidris himantopus
Curlew sandpiper, Calidris ferruginea (V)
Sanderling, Calidris alba
Baird's sandpiper, Calidris bairdii
White-rumped sandpiper, Calidris fuscicollis
Buff-breasted sandpiper, Calidris subruficollis
Pectoral sandpiper, Calidris melanotos
Semipalmated sandpiper, Calidris pusilla (V)
Western sandpiper, Calidris mauri (V)
Giant snipe, Gallinago undulata (H)
Pantanal snipe, Gallinago paraguaiae
Magellanic snipe, Gallinago magellanica
Wilson's phalarope, Phalaropus tricolor
Spotted sandpiper, Actitis macularia
Solitary sandpiper, Tringa solitaria
Greater yellowlegs, Tringa melanoleuca
Willet, Tringa semipalmata
Lesser yellowlegs, Tringa flavipes

Seedsnipes
Order: CharadriiformesFamily: Thinocoridae

The seedsnipes are a small family of birds that resemble sparrows. They have short legs and long wings and are herbivorous waders. One species has been recorded in Uruguay.

Least seedsnipe, Thinocorus rumicivorus

Jacanas
Order: CharadriiformesFamily: Jacanidae

The jacanas are a group of waders found throughout the tropics. They are identifiable by their huge feet and claws which enable them to walk on floating vegetation in the shallow lakes that are their preferred habitat. One species has been recorded in Uruguay.

Wattled jacana, Jacana jacana

Painted-snipes
Order: CharadriiformesFamily: Rostratulidae

Painted-snipes are short-legged, long-billed birds similar in shape to the true snipes, but more brightly colored. One species has been recorded in Uruguay.

South American painted-snipe, Nycticryphes semicollaris

Skuas
Order: CharadriiformesFamily: Stercorariidae

The family Stercorariidae are, in general, medium to large birds, typically with gray or brown plumage, often with white markings on the wings. They nest on the ground in temperate and arctic regions and are long-distance migrants. Six species have been recorded in Uruguay.

Chilean skua, Stercorarius chilensis (V)
South polar skua, Stercorarius maccormicki
Brown skua, Stercorarius antarcticus
Pomarine jaeger, Stercorarius pomarinus
Parasitic jaeger, Stercorarius parasiticus
Long-tailed jaeger, Stercorarius longicaudus

Skimmers
Order: CharadriiformesFamily: Rynchopidae

Skimmers are a small family of tropical tern-like birds. They have an elongated lower mandible which they use to feed by flying low over the water surface and skimming the water for small fish. One species has been recorded in Uruguay.

Black skimmer, Rynchops niger

Gulls
Order: CharadriiformesFamily: Laridae

Laridae is a family of medium to large seabirds and includes gulls, kittiwakes, and terns. Gulls are typically gray or white, often with black markings on the head or wings. They have longish bills and webbed feet. Terns are a group of generally medium to large seabirds typically with gray or white plumage, often with black markings on the head. Most terns hunt fish by diving but some pick insects off the surface of fresh water. Terns are generally long-lived birds, with several species living in excess of 30 years. Nineteen species have been recorded in Uruguay.

Brown-hooded gull, Chroicocephalus maculipennis
Gray-hooded gull, Chroicocephalus cirrocephalus
Franklin's gull, Leucophaeus pipixcan (V)
Olrog's gull, Larus atlanticus
Kelp gull, Larus dominicanus
Brown noddy, Anous stolidus (H)
Least tern, Sternula antillarum (V)
Yellow-billed tern, Sternula superciliaris
Large-billed tern, Phaetusa simplex
Gull-billed tern, Gelochelidon nilotica
Black tern, Chlidonias niger (V)
Common tern, Sterna hirundo
Arctic tern, Sterna paradisaea (V)
South American tern, Sterna hirundinacea
Antarctic tern, Sterna vittata
Snowy-crowned tern, Sterna trudeaui
Elegant tern, Thalasseus elegans (V)
Sandwich tern, Thalasseus sandvicensis
Royal tern, Thalasseus maximus

Penguins
Order: SphenisciformesFamily: Spheniscidae

The penguins are a group of aquatic, flightless birds living almost exclusively in the Southern Hemisphere. Most penguins feed on krill, fish, squid, and other forms of sealife caught while swimming underwater. Four species have been recorded in Uruguay.

King penguin, Aptenodytes patagonicus (V)
Magellanic penguin, Spheniscus magellanicus
Macaroni penguin, Eudyptes chrysolophus (V)
Rockhopper penguin, Eudyptes chrysocome

Albatrosses
Order: ProcellariiformesFamily: Diomedeidae

The albatrosses are among the largest of flying birds, and the great albatrosses from the genus Diomedea have the largest wingspans of any extant birds. Eight species have been recorded in Uruguay.

Royal albatross, Diomedea epomophora
Wandering albatross, Diomedea exulans
Sooty albatross, Phoebetria fusca (V)
Yellow-nosed albatross, Thalassarche chlororhynchos
Black-browed albatross, Thalassarche melanophris
Gray-headed albatross, Thalassarche chrysostoma (H)
Buller's albatross, Thalassarche bulleri (V)
White-capped albatross, Thalassarche cauta

Southern storm-petrels
Order: ProcellariiformesFamily: Oceanitidae

The storm-petrels are the smallest seabirds, relatives of the petrels, feeding on planktonic crustaceans and small fish picked from the surface, typically while hovering. The flight is fluttering and sometimes bat-like. Until 2018, this family's species were included with the other storm-petrels in family Hydrobatidae. Four species have been recorded in Uruguay.

White-bellied storm-petrel, Fregetta grallaria (V)
Black-bellied storm-petrel, Fregetta tropica (V)
Wilson's storm-petrel, Oceanites oceanicus
Gray-backed storm-petrel, Garrodia nereis (V)

Northern storm-petrels
Order: ProcellariiformesFamily: Hydrobatidae

Though the members of this family are similar in many respects to the southern storm-petrels, including their general appearance and habits, there are enough genetic differences to warrant their placement in a separate family. One species has been recorded in Uruguay.

Leach's storm-petrel, Hydrobates leucorhoa (V)

Shearwaters
Order: ProcellariiformesFamily: Procellariidae

The procellariids are the main group of medium-sized "true petrels", characterised by united nostrils with medium septum and a long outer functional primary. Twenty-one species have been recorded in Uruguay.

Southern giant-petrel, Macronectes giganteus
Northern giant-petrel, Macronectes halli
Southern fulmar, Fulmarus glacialoides
Cape petrel, Daption capense
Kerguelen petrel, Aphrodroma brevirostris (V)
Great-winged petrel, Pterodroma macroptera (V)
Soft-plumaged petrel, Pterodroma mollis
Atlantic petrel, Pterodroma incerta
Trindade petrel, Pterodroma arminjoniana (V)
Blue petrel, Halobaena caerulea (V)
Antarctic prion, Pachyptila desolata
Slender-billed prion, Pachyptila belcheri
Gray petrel, Procellaria cinerea (V)
White-chinned petrel, Procellaria aequinoctialis
Spectacled petrel, Procellaria conspicillata
Cory's shearwater, Calonectris diomedea
Cape Verde shearwater, Calonectris edwardsii
Sooty shearwater, Ardenna griseus
Great shearwater, Ardenna gravis
Manx shearwater, Puffinus puffinus
Common diving-petrel, Pelecanoides urinatrix (V)

Storks
Order: CiconiiformesFamily: Ciconiidae

Storks are large, long-legged, long-necked, wading birds with long, stout bills. Storks are mute, but bill-clattering is an important mode of communication at the nest. Their nests can be large and may be reused for many years. Many species are migratory. Three species have been recorded in Uruguay.

Maguari stork, Ciconia maguari
Jabiru, Jabiru mycteria (V)
Wood stork, Mycteria americana

Frigatebirds
Order: SuliformesFamily: Fregatidae

Frigatebirds are large seabirds usually found over tropical oceans. They are large, black-and-white, or completely black, with long wings and deeply forked tails. The males have colored inflatable throat pouches. They do not swim or walk and cannot take off from a flat surface. Having the largest wingspan-to-body-weight ratio of any bird, they are essentially aerial, able to stay aloft for more than a week. One species has been recorded in Uruguay.

Magnificent frigatebird, Fregata magnificens

Boobies
Order: SuliformesFamily: Sulidae

The sulids comprise the gannets and boobies. Both groups are medium to large coastal seabirds that plunge-dive for fish. Three species have been recorded in Uruguay.

Cape gannet, Morus capensis (V)
Masked booby, Sula dactylatra (V)
Brown booby, Sula leucogaster (V)

Anhingas
Order: SuliformesFamily: Anhingidae

Anhingas are often called "snake-birds" because of their long thin neck, which gives a snake-like appearance when they swim with their bodies submerged. The males have black and dark-brown plumage, an erectile crest on the nape, and a larger bill than the female. The females have much paler plumage especially on the neck and underparts. The darters have completely webbed feet and their legs are short and set far back on the body. Their plumage is somewhat permeable, like that of cormorants, and they spread their wings to dry after diving. One species has been recorded in Uruguay.

Anhinga, Anhinga anhinga

Cormorants
Order: SuliformesFamily: Phalacrocoracidae

Phalacrocoracidae is a family of medium to large coastal, fish-eating seabirds that includes cormorants and shags. Plumage coloration varies, with the majority having mainly dark plumage, some species being black-and-white, and a few being colorful. Two species have been recorded in Uruguay.

Neotropic cormorant, Phalacrocorax brasilianus
Imperial cormorant, Phalacrocorax atriceps

Herons
Order: PelecaniformesFamily: Ardeidae

The family Ardeidae contains the bitterns, herons, and egrets. Herons and egrets are medium to large wading birds with long necks and legs. Bitterns tend to be shorter necked and more wary. Members of Ardeidae fly with their necks retracted, unlike other long-necked birds such as storks, ibises, and spoonbills. Twelve species have been recorded in Uruguay.

Rufescent tiger-heron, Tigrisoma lineatum
Pinnated bittern, Botaurus pinnatus
Stripe-backed bittern, Ixobrychus involucris
Black-crowned night-heron, Nycticorax nycticorax
Striated heron, Butorides striata
Cattle egret, Bubulcus ibis
Cocoi heron, Ardea cocoi
Great egret, Ardea alba
Whistling heron, Syrigma sibilatrix
Tricolored heron, Egretta tricolor (V)
Snowy egret, Egretta thula
Little blue heron, Egretta caerulea

Ibises
Order: PelecaniformesFamily: Threskiornithidae

Threskiornithidae is a family of large terrestrial and wading birds which includes the ibises and spoonbills. They have long, broad wings with 11 primary and about 20 secondary feathers. They are strong fliers and despite their size and weight, very capable soarers. Five species have been recorded in Uruguay.

White-faced ibis, Plegadis chihi
Bare-faced ibis, Phimosus infuscatus
Plumbeous ibis, Theristicus caerulescens
Buff-necked ibis, Theristicus caudatus
Roseate spoonbill, Platalea ajaja

New World vultures
Order: CathartiformesFamily: Cathartidae

The New World vultures are not closely related to Old World vultures, but superficially resemble them because of convergent evolution. Like the Old World vultures, they are scavengers. However, unlike Old World vultures, which find carcasses by sight, New World vultures have a good sense of smell with which they locate carrion. Three species have been recorded in Uruguay.

Black vulture, Coragyps atratus
Turkey vulture, Cathartes aura
Lesser yellow-headed vulture, Cathartes burrovianus

Osprey
Order: AccipitriformesFamily: Pandionidae

The family Pandionidae contains only one species, the osprey. The osprey is a medium-large raptor which is a specialist fish-eater with a worldwide distribution.

Osprey, Pandion haliaetus

Hawks
Order: AccipitriformesFamily: Accipitridae

Accipitridae is a family of birds of prey, which includes hawks, eagles, kites, harriers, and Old World vultures. These birds have powerful hooked beaks for tearing flesh from their prey, strong legs, powerful talons, and keen eyesight. Twenty species have been recorded in Uruguay.

White-tailed kite, Elanus leucurus
Swallow-tailed kite, Elanoides forficatus (V)
Black-collared hawk, Busarellus nigricollis
Snail kite, Rostrhamus sociabilis
Mississippi kite, Ictinia mississippiensis (V)
Cinereous harrier, Circus cinereus
Long-winged harrier, Circus buffoni
Sharp-shinned hawk, Accipiter striatus 
Bicolored hawk, Accipiter bicolor
Crane hawk, Geranospiza caerulescens
Savanna hawk, Buteogallus meridionalis
Great black hawk, Buteogallus urubitinga
Chaco eagle, Buteogallus coronatus (Extirpated)
Roadside hawk, Rupornis magnirostris
Harris's hawk, Parabuteo unicinctus
White-tailed hawk, Geranoaetus albicaudatus
Variable hawk, Geranoaetus polyosoma
Black-chested buzzard-eagle, Geranoaetus melanoleucus
Short-tailed hawk, Buteo brachyurus (V)
Swainson's hawk, Buteo swainsoni

Barn owls
Order: StrigiformesFamily: Tytonidae

Barn owls are medium to large owls with large heads and heart-shaped faces. They have long strong legs with powerful talons. One species has been recorded in Uruguay.

Barn owl, Tyto alba

Owls
Order: StrigiformesFamily: Strigidae

The typical owls are small to large solitary nocturnal birds of prey. They have large forward-facing eyes and ears, a hawk-like beak, and a conspicuous circle of feathers around each eye called a facial disk. Eight species have been recorded in Uruguay.

Tropical screech-owl, Megascops choliba
Long-tufted screech-owl, Megascops sanctaecatarinae
Great horned owl, Bubo virginianus
Ferruginous pygmy-owl, Glaucidium brasilianum
Burrowing owl, Athene cunicularia
Buff-fronted owl, Aegolius harrisii
Striped owl, Asio clamator
Short-eared owl, Asio flammeus

Trogons
Order: TrogoniformesFamily: Trogonidae

The family Trogonidae includes trogons and quetzals. Found in tropical woodlands worldwide, they feed on insects and fruit, and their broad bills and weak legs reflect their diet and arboreal habits. Although their flight is fast, they are reluctant to fly any distance. Trogons have soft, often colorful, feathers with distinctive male and female plumage. One species has been recorded in Uruguay. 

Surucua trogon, Trogon surrucura

Kingfishers
Order: CoraciiformesFamily: Alcedinidae

Kingfishers are medium-sized birds with large heads, long pointed bills, short legs, and stubby tails. Three species have been recorded in Uruguay.

Ringed kingfisher, Megaceryle torquata
Amazon kingfisher, Chloroceryle amazona
Green kingfisher, Chloroceryle americana

Toucans
Order: PiciformesFamily: Ramphastidae

Toucans are near passerine birds from the neotropics. They are brightly marked and have enormous, colorful bills which in some species amount to half their body length. One species has been recorded in Uruguay.

Toco toucan, Ramphastos toco

Woodpeckers
Order: PiciformesFamily: Picidae

Woodpeckers are small to medium-sized birds with chisel-like beaks, short legs, stiff tails, and long tongues used for capturing insects. Some species have feet with two toes pointing forward and two backward, while several species have only three toes. Many woodpeckers have the habit of tapping noisily on tree trunks with their beaks. Ten species have been recorded in Uruguay.

White-barred piculet, Picumnus cirratus
Mottled piculet, Picumnus nebulosus
White woodpecker, Melanerpes candidus
White-fronted woodpecker, Melanerpes cactorum
White-spotted woodpecker, Dryobates spilogaster
Checkered woodpecker, Dryobates mixtus
Cream-backed woodpecker, Campephilus leucopogon
White-browed woodpecker, Piculus aurulentus
Green-barred woodpecker, Colaptes melanochloros
Campo flicker, Colaptes campestris

Seriemas
Order: CariamiformesFamily: Cariamidae

The seriemas are terrestrial birds which run rather than fly (though they are able to fly for short distances). They have long legs, necks, and tails, but only short wings, reflecting their way of life. They are brownish birds with short bills and erectile crests, found on fairly-dry open grasslands. One species has been recorded in Uruguay.

Red-legged seriema, Cariama cristata

Falcons
Order: FalconiformesFamily: Falconidae

Falconidae is a family of diurnal birds of prey. They differ from hawks, eagles, and kites in that they kill with their beaks instead of their talons. Seven species have been recorded in Uruguay.

Spot-winged falconet, Spiziapteryx circumcincta (H)
Crested caracara, Caracara plancus
Yellow-headed caracara, Milvago chimachima
Chimango caracara, Milvago chimango
American kestrel, Falco sparverius
Aplomado falcon, Falco femoralis
Peregrine falcon, Falco peregrinus

New World and African parrots
Order: PsittaciformesFamily: Psittacidae

Parrots are small to large birds with a characteristic curved beak. Their upper mandibles have slight mobility in the joint with the skull and they have a generally erect stance. All parrots are zygodactyl, having the four toes on each foot placed two at the front and two to the back. Eight species have been recorded in Uruguay.

Monk parakeet, Myiopsitta monachus
Maroon-bellied parakeet, Pyrrhura frontalis
Burrowing parakeet, Cyanoliseus patagonus
Glaucous macaw, Anodorhynchus glaucus (believed extinct)
Nanday parakeet, Aratinga nenday (I)
Blue-crowned parakeet, Thectocercus acuticaudatus
Mitred parakeet, Psittacara mitratus (I)
White-eyed parakeet, Psittacara leucophthalmus

Antbirds
Order: PasseriformesFamily: Thamnophilidae

The antbirds are a large family of small passerine birds of subtropical and tropical Central and South America. They are forest birds which tend to feed on insects at or near the ground. A sizable minority of them specialize in following columns of army ants to eat small invertebrates that leave their hiding places to flee from the ants. Many species lack bright color; brown, black, and white are the dominant tones. Three species have been recorded in Uruguay.

Large-tailed antshrike, Mackenziaena leachii
Rufous-capped antshrike, Thamnophilus ruficapillus
Variable antshrike, Thamnophilus caerulescens

Gnateaters
Order: PasseriformesFamily: Conopophagidae

The gnateaters are round, short-tailed, and long-legged birds which are closely related to the antbirds. One species has been recorded in Uruguay.

Rufous gnateater, Conopophaga lineata

Ovenbirds
Order: PasseriformesFamily: Furnariidae

Ovenbirds comprise a large family of small sub-oscine passerine bird species found in Central and South America. They are a diverse group of insectivores which gets its name from the elaborate "oven-like" clay nests built by some species, although others build stick nests or nest in tunnels or clefts in rock. The woodcreepers are brownish birds which maintain an upright vertical posture, supported by their stiff tail vanes. They feed mainly on insects taken from tree trunks.  Thirty-five species have been recorded in Uruguay. Three species are migratory and reach Uruguayan territory in winter. 

Common miner, Geositta cunicularia
Olivaceous woodcreeper, Sittasomus griseicapillus
Planalto woodcreeper, Dendrocolaptes platyrostris
Scimitar-billed woodcreeper, Drymornis bridgesii
Narrow-billed woodcreeper, Lepidocolaptes angustirostris
Scalloped woodcreeper, Lepidocolaptes falcinellus
Rufous hornero, Furnarius rufus
Sharp-tailed streamcreeper, Lochmias nematura
Wren-like rushbird, Phleocryptes melanops
Curve-billed reedhaunter, Limnornis curvirostris
Scale-throated earthcreeper, Upucerthia dumetaria (H)
Buff-winged cinclodes, Cinclodes fuscus
Sharp-billed treehunter, Heliobletus contaminatus
Buff-browed foliage-gleaner, Syndactyla rufosuperciliata
Tufted tit-spinetail, Leptasthenura platensis
Little thornbird, Phacellodomus sibilatrix
Freckle-breasted thornbird, Phacellodomus striaticollis
Greater thornbird, Phacellodomus ruber
Orange-breasted thornbird, Phacellodomus ferrugineigula
Firewood-gatherer, Anumbius annumbi
Lark-like brushrunner, Coryphistera alaudina
Short-billed canastero, Asthenes baeri
Hudson's canastero, Asthenes hudsoni
Sharp-billed canastero, Asthenes pyrrholeuca
Straight-billed reedhaunter, Limnoctites rectirostris
Sulphur-bearded reedhaunter, Limnoctites sulphuriferus
Stripe-crowned spinetail, Cranioleuca pyrrhophia
Bay-capped wren-spinetail, Spartonoica maluroides
Brown cacholote, Pseudoseisura lophotes
Yellow-chinned spinetail, Certhiaxis cinnamomeus
Chotoy spinetail, Schoeniophylax phryganophila
Gray-bellied spinetail, Synallaxis cinerascens
Spix's spinetail, Synallaxis spixi
Pale-breasted spinetail, Synallaxis albescens
Sooty-fronted spinetail, Synallaxis frontalis

Cotingas
Order: PasseriformesFamily: Cotingidae

The cotingas are birds of forests or forest edges in tropical South America. Comparatively little is known about this diverse group, although all have broad bills with hooked tips, rounded wings and strong legs. The males of many of the species are brightly colored, or decorated with plumes or wattles. Two species have been recorded in Uruguay.

White-tipped plantcutter, Phytotoma rutila
Red-ruffed fruitcrow, Pyroderus scutatus (V)

Tityras
Order: PasseriformesFamily: Tityridae

Tityridae are suboscine passerine birds found in forest and woodland in the Neotropics. The species in this family were formerly spread over the families Tyrannidae, Pipridae, and Cotingidae. They are small to medium-sized birds. They do not have the sophisticated vocal capabilities of the songbirds. Most, but not all, have plain coloring. Four species have been recorded in Uruguay.

White-naped xenopsaris, Xenopsaris albinucha
Green-backed becard, Pachyramphus viridis
White-winged becard, Pachyramphus polychopterus
Crested becard, Pachyramphus validus

Tyrant flycatchers
Order: PasseriformesFamily: Tyrannidae

Tyrant flycatchers are passerine birds which occur throughout North and South America. They superficially resemble the Old World flycatchers, but are more robust and have stronger bills. They do not have the sophisticated vocal capabilities of the songbirds. Most, but not all, have plain coloring. As the name implies, most are insectivorous. Sixty-three species have been recorded in Uruguay.

Mottle-cheeked tyrannulet, Phylloscartes ventralis
Yellow-olive flycatcher, Tolmomyias sulphurescens
Pearly-vented tody-tyrant, Hemitriccus margaritaceiventer
Ochre-faced tody-flycatcher, Poecilotriccus plumbeiceps
Cliff flycatcher, Hirundinea ferruginea
Fulvous-crowned scrub-tyrant, Euscarthmus meloryphus
Southern beardless-tyrannulet, Camptostoma obsoletum
Yellow-bellied elaenia, Elaenia flavogaster (V)
Large elaenia, Elaenia spectabilis
White-crested elaenia, Elaenia albiceps
Small-billed elaenia, Elaenia parvirostris
Olivaceous elaenia, Elaenia mesoleuca
Small-headed elaenia, Elaenia sordida
Greenish elaenia, Myiopagis viridicata
Suiriri flycatcher, Suiriri suiriri
Rough-legged tyrannulet, Phyllomyias burmeisteri (V)
Greenish tyrannulet, Phyllomyias virescens (V)
Bearded tachuri, Polystictus pectoralis
Sharp-tailed tyrant, Culicivora caudacuta
Crested doradito, Pseudocolopteryx sclateri
Warbling doradito, Pseudocolopteryx flaviventris
Sooty tyrannulet, Serpophaga nigricans
White-crested tyrannulet, Serpophaga subcristata
White-bellied tyrannulet, Serpophaga munda (V)
Straneck's tyrannulet, Serpophaga griseicapilla
Piratic flycatcher, Legatus leucophaius (V)
Great kiskadee, Pitangus sulphuratus
Cattle tyrant, Machetornis rixosa
Boat-billed flycatcher, Megarynchus pitangua
Streaked flycatcher, Myiodynastes maculatus
Variegated flycatcher, Empidonomus varius
Crowned slaty flycatcher, Empidonomus aurantioatrocristatus
Tropical kingbird, Tyrannus melancholicus
Fork-tailed flycatcher, Tyrannus savana
Eastern kingbird, Tyrannus tyrannus (V)
Rufous casiornis, Casiornis rufus
Swainson's flycatcher, Myiarchus swainsoni
Brown-crested flycatcher, Myiarchus tyrannulus
Bran-colored flycatcher, Myiophobus fasciatus
Southern scrub-flycatcher, Sublegatus modestus
Vermilion flycatcher, Pyrocephalus rubinus
Black-backed water-tyrant, Fluvicola albiventer
Masked water-tyrant, Fluvicola nengeta (V)
White-headed marsh tyrant, Arundinicola leucocephala (V)
Streamer-tailed tyrant, Gubernetes yetapa (V)
Strange-tailed tyrant, Alectrurus risora (V)
Austral negrito, Lessonia rufa
Spectacled tyrant, Hymenops perspicillatus
Crested black-tyrant, Knipolegus lophotes
Blue-billed black-tyrant, Knipolegus cyanirostris
Yellow-browed tyrant, Satrapa icterophrys
Dark-faced ground-tyrant, Muscisaxicola maclovianus
White-browed ground-tyrant, Muscisaxicola albilora (V)
White monjita, Xolmis irupero
Gray monjita, Nengetus cinereus
Black-crowned monjita, Neoxolmis coronatus
Chocolate-vented tyrant, Neoxolmis rufiventris
Black-and-white monjita, Heteroxolmis dominicanus
Gray-bellied shrike-tyrant, Agriornis micropterus (V)
Lesser shrike-tyrant, Agriornis murinus (V)
Fuscous flycatcher, Cnemotriccus fuscatus
Euler's flycatcher, Lathrotriccus euleri
Many-colored rush tyrant, Tachuris rubrigastra

Vireos
Order: PasseriformesFamily: Vireonidae

The vireos are a group of small to medium-sized passerine birds. They are typically greenish in color and resemble wood warblers apart from their heavier bills. Two species have been recorded in Uruguay.

Rufous-browed peppershrike, Cyclarhis gujanensis
Chivi vireo, Vireo chivi

Jays
Order: PasseriformesFamily: Corvidae

The family Corvidae includes crows, ravens, jays, choughs, magpies, treepies, nutcrackers, and ground jays. Corvids are above average in size among the Passeriformes, and some of the larger species show high levels of intelligence. Three species have been recorded in Uruguay.

Purplish jay, Cyanocorax cyanomelas (V)
Azure jay, Cyanocorax caeruleus
Plush-crested jay, Cyanocorax chrysops

Swallows
Order: PasseriformesFamily: Hirundinidae

The family Hirundinidae is adapted to aerial feeding. They have a slender streamlined body, long pointed wings, and a short bill with a wide gape. The feet are adapted to perching rather than walking, and the front toes are partially joined at the base. Eleven species have been recorded in Uruguay.

Blue-and-white swallow, Pygochelidon cyanoleuca
Tawny-headed swallow, Alopochelidon fucata
Southern rough-winged swallow, Stelgidopteryx ruficollis
Brown-chested martin, Progne tapera
Gray-breasted martin, Progne chalybea
Southern martin, Progne elegans
White-rumped swallow, Tachycineta leucorrhoa
Chilean swallow, Tachycineta leucopyga
Bank swallow, Riparia riparia (V)
Barn swallow, Hirundo rustica
Cliff swallow, Petrochelidon pyrrhonota

Wrens
Order: PasseriformesFamily: Troglodytidae

The wrens are mainly small and inconspicuous except for their loud songs. These birds have short wings and thin down-turned bills. Several species often hold their tails upright. All are insectivorous. Two species have been recorded in Uruguay.

House wren, Troglodytes aedon
Grass wren, Cistothorus platensis

Gnatcatchers
Order: PasseriformesFamily: Polioptilidae

These dainty birds resemble Old World warblers in their build and habits, moving restlessly through the foliage seeking insects. The gnatcatchers and gnatwrens are mainly soft bluish gray in color and have the typical insectivore's long sharp bill. They are birds of fairly open woodland or scrub which nest in bushes or trees. One species has been recorded in Uruguay.

Masked gnatcatcher, Polioptila dumicola

Thrushes
Order: PasseriformesFamily: Turdidae

The thrushes are a group of passerine birds that occur mainly in the Old World. They are plump, soft plumaged, small to medium-sized insectivores or sometimes omnivores, often feeding on the ground. Many have attractive songs. Six species have been recorded in Uruguay.

Yellow-legged thrush, Turdus flavipes (V)
Pale-breasted thrush, Turdus leucomelas
Rufous-bellied thrush, Turdus rufiventris
Creamy-bellied thrush, Turdus amaurochalinus
Blacksmith thrush, Turdus subalaris
White-necked thrush, Turdus albicollis

Mockingbirds
Order: PasseriformesFamily: Mimidae

The mimids are a family of passerine birds that includes thrashers, mockingbirds, tremblers, and the New World catbirds. These birds are notable for their vocalizations, especially their ability to mimic a wide variety of birds and other sounds heard outdoors. Their coloring tends towards dull-grays and browns. Two species have been recorded in Uruguay.

Chalk-browed mockingbird, Mimus saturninus
White-banded mockingbird, Mimus triurus

Starlings
Order: PasseriformesFamily: Sturnidae

Starlings are small to medium-sized passerine birds. Their flight is strong and direct and they are very gregarious. Their preferred habitat is fairly open country. They eat insects and fruit. Plumage is typically dark with a metallic sheen. One species has been recorded in Uruguay.

European starling, Sturnus vulgaris (I)

Old World sparrows
Order: PasseriformesFamily: Passeridae

Sparrows are small passerine birds. sparrows tend to be small, plump, brown or gray birds with short tails and short powerful beaks. Sparrows are seed eaters, but they also consume small insects. One species has been recorded in Uruguay.

House sparrow, Passer domesticus (I)

Pipits and wagtails
Order: PasseriformesFamily: Motacillidae

Motacillidae is a family of small passerine birds with medium to long tails. They include the wagtails, longclaws, and pipits. They are slender ground-feeding insectivores of open country. Five species have been recorded in Uruguay.

Yellowish pipit, Anthus chii
Short-billed pipit, Anthus furcatus
Correndera pipit, Anthus correndera
Ochre-breasted pipit, Anthus nattereri
Hellmayr's pipit, Anthus hellmayri

Finches
Order: PasseriformesFamily: Fringillidae

Finches are seed-eating passerine birds that are small to moderately large and have a strong beak, usually conical and in some species very large. All have twelve tail feathers and nine primaries. These birds have a bouncing flight with alternating bouts of flapping and gliding on closed wings, and most sing well. Five species have been recorded in Uruguay.

European greenfinch, Chloris chloris (I)
European goldfinch, Carduelis carduelis (I)
Hooded siskin, Spinus magellanicus
Blue-naped chlorophonia, Chlorophonia cyanea 
Golden-rumped euphonia, Chlorophonia cyanocephala
Purple-throated euphonia, Euphonia chlorotica

Sparrows
Order: PasseriformesFamily: Passerellidae

Most of the species are known as sparrows, but these birds are not closely related to the Old World sparrows which are in the family Passeridae. Many of these have distinctive head patterns. Two species have been recorded in Uruguay.

Grassland sparrow, Ammodramus humeralis
Rufous-collared sparrow, Zonotrichia capensis

Blackbirds
Order: PasseriformesFamily: Icteridae

The icterids are a group of small to medium-sized, often colorful, passerine birds restricted to the New World and include the grackles, New World blackbirds, and New World orioles. Most species have black as the predominant plumage color, often enlivened by yellow, orange, or red. Eighteen species have been recorded in Uruguay.

Bobolink, Dolichonyx oryzivorus (V)
White-browed meadowlark, Leistes superciliaris
Pampas meadowlark, Leistes defilippii
Solitary black cacique, Cacicus solitarius
Golden-winged cacique, Cacicus chrysopterus
Red-rumped cacique, Cacicus haemorrhous
Variable oriole, Icterus pyrrhopterus
Screaming cowbird, Molothrus rufoaxillaris
Shiny cowbird, Molothrus bonariensis
Scarlet-headed blackbird, Amblyramphus holosericeus
Chopi blackbird, Gnorimopsar chopi
Grayish baywing, Agelaioides badius
Unicolored blackbird, Agelasticus cyanopus (V)
Yellow-winged blackbird, Agelasticus thilius
Chestnut-capped blackbird, Chrysomus ruficapillus
Saffron-cowled blackbird, Xanthopsar flavus
Yellow-rumped marshbird, Pseudoleistes guirahuro
Brown-and-yellow marshbird, Pseudoleistes virescens

Wood-warblers
Order: PasseriformesFamily: Parulidae

The wood-warblers are a group of small, often colorful, passerine birds restricted to the New World. Most are arboreal, but some are terrestrial. Most members of this family are insectivores. Five species have been recorded in Uruguay.

Masked yellowthroat, Geothlypis aequinoctialis
Tropical parula, Setophaga pitiayumi
Blackpoll warbler, Setophaga striata (V)
White-browed warbler, Myiothlypis leucoblephara
Golden-crowned warbler, Basileuterus culicivorus

Cardinal grosbeaks
Order: PasseriformesFamily: Cardinalidae

The cardinals are a family of robust, seed-eating birds with strong bills. They are typically associated with open woodland. The sexes usually have distinct plumages. Three species have been recorded in Uruguay.

Hepatic tanager, Piranga flava
Glaucous-blue grosbeak, Cyanoloxia glaucocaerulea
Ultramarine grosbeak, Cyanoloxia brissonii

Tanagers
Order: PasseriformesFamily: Thraupidae

The tanagers are a large group of small to medium-sized passerine birds restricted to the New World, mainly in the tropics. Many species are brightly colored. As a family they are omnivorous, but individual species specialize in eating fruits, seeds, insects, or other types of food. Most have short, rounded wings. Thirty-eight species have been recorded in Uruguay.

Saffron finch, Sicalis flaveola
Grassland yellow-finch, Sicalis luteola
Mourning sierra-finch, Rhopospina fruticeti (V)
Blue-black grassquit, Volatinia jacarina
Ruby-crowned tanager, Tachyphonus coronatus (V)
Black-goggled tanager, Trichothraupis melanops
Red-crested finch, Coryphospingus cucullatus
White-bellied seedeater, Sporophila leucoptera (V)
Pearly-bellied seedeater, Sporophila pileata
Tawny-bellied seedeater, Sporophila hypoxantha
Dark-throated seedeater, Sporophila ruficollis
Marsh seedeater, Sporophila palustris
Rufous-rumped seedeater, Sporophila hypochroma
Chestnut seedeater, Sporophila cinnamomea
Double-collared seedeater, Sporophila caerulescens
Rusty-collared seedeater, Sporophila collaris
Many-colored chaco finch, Saltatricula multicolor
Bluish-gray saltator, Saltator coerulescens
Green-winged saltator, Saltator similis
Golden-billed saltator, Saltator aurantiirostris
Great Pampa-finch, Embernagra platensis
Wedge-tailed grass-finch, Emberizoides herbicola
Lesser grass-finch, Emberizoides ypiranganus
Cinnamon warbling-finch, Poospiza ornata (V)
Black-and-rufous warbling-finch, Poospiza nigrorufa
Gray-throated warbling-finch, Microspingus cabanisi
Black-capped warbling-finch, Microspingus melanoleucus
Long-tailed reed finch, Donacospiza albifrons
Bananaquit, Coereba flaveola
Diuca finch, Diuca diuca (V)
Yellow cardinal, Gubernatrix cristata
Red-crested cardinal, Paroaria coronata
Yellow-billed cardinal, Paroaria capitata
Diademed tanager, Stephanophorus diadematus
Fawn-breasted tanager, Pipraeidea melanonota
Blue-and-yellow tanager, Rauenia bonariensis
Chestnut-backed tanager, Stilpnia preciosa
Sayaca tanager, Thraupis sayaca

See also
Fauna of Uruguay
List of birds
Lists of birds by region

References

Uruguay
 
Birds
Uruguay